All Saints Catholic School is a Roman Catholic secondary school located on Terling Road, Dagenham in the London Borough of Barking and Dagenham, England.

Status
With around 1100 students, it is the only Catholic voluntary aided comprehensive school in Barking and Dagenham. It is also a training college, receiving the status in 2008, making it one of the first twin colleges.

History
All Saints School was previously named Bishop Ward which between the mid 1950s (1954?) and the early 1960s was a mixed school then it became an all-boys school when the girls were moved to the Sacred Heart all-girls school they combined the two again in 1989.

The school was notable as a specialist college in technology, one of the first in the country.

Performance
Results at Bishop Ward were poor with an atmosphere that Desmond 'Des' Smith described as "depressed and violent", Following the appointment of Smith as head teacher in 1984 results steadily improved until in 2003 it was considered "the second most improved school in England". The March 2003 Ofsted report summarised the situation "The school has many very good features. Strategies adopted by the headteacher and governors have led to overall GCSE results rising faster than the national trend for some years, culminating in well above average results in 2002". However, the inspectors also said that the school's strategy led to several subjects of the National Curriculum not being taught to all pupils in Years 10 and 11. In addition, National Curriculum music provision remained poor.

Improvements continued and in the report of 6 June 2007 inspection Ofsted rated the school as Grade 1 ''Outstanding saying "The school provides its students with an outstanding education. Standards are high and students achieve extremely well as a result of excellent teaching. The leaders and managers believe that each child is important and this maxim is at the heart of their decision making. There is a clear
vision and a hunger for improvement building on the school's record of outstanding success." However, the school recognises the need to extend some aspects of its provision for the 14–19 age group including improving the guidance in the sixth form.

Cash for peerages
Since January 2006, while headmaster at the school, Smith has been notorious for making the indiscreet remarks that triggered the Cash for Peerages scandal. At the end of the 2005–06 academic school year Smith retired and was replaced by the Deputy Head Teacher Kevin Wilson.

References

External links
 Official site

Secondary schools in the London Borough of Barking and Dagenham
Catholic secondary schools in the Diocese of Brentwood
Educational institutions established in 1992
1992 establishments in England
Voluntary aided schools in London
Dagenham